John Calhoun Phillips (1870–1943), Arizona politician, 3rd Governor of Arizona
James Charles Phillips (b. 1933), American physicist